Albert Kudjabo (15 March 1896 – 1 November 1934) was a Congolese soldier for the Belgian Army during the First World War, and prisoner of war.

Early life 
Kudjabo was born at the northeastern side of the Congo Free State. As a child, he received his education at a Catholic mission school in Kilo, Orientale Province. According to the archives of the German sound archive, he was a farmer who could handle mining equipment. Aged seventeen, he moved to Namur, Belgium. In Ghent, he worked as a so-called 'boy' or young household help.

First World War 
On 5 August 1914, a Congolese Volunteers' Corps for the Belgian Army was founded. Several Congolese volunteers enrolled, including Paul Panda Farnana, Joseph Adipanga, and Kudjabo. At that time, Kudjabo was wounded at his head. First, he stayed at the camp Soltau near Hannover, but was transferred to Münster by March 1917. The Royal Prussian Phonetic Institute (Königlich preußische phonographische Kommission) was interested in recording Kudjabo, who, according to coordinator of the recordings of African languages for the Institute Carl Meinhof, "knows the drum language". In addition, they used a Melanesian drum for the recording, underlining the creation of a composite "image of exotic otherness". In 1917, still a prisoner of war, his voice was recorded at the prisoner of war camp in Münster by the Phonetic Institute.

Later life 
After the war, Kudjabo shared an apartment with another Congolese war veteran, Antoine Manglunki, and his wife Julia Caron, in Schaerbeek. Kudjabo moved to Liège less than one year later. In 1919, Kudjabo co-founded the Union congolaise, together with Farnana and Adipanga. On 17 December 1925, he married Ludovica Kempeneer. They had four children.
Kudjabo died in 1934 of a lung disease.

Honours 
:  (posthumously)

Legacy 
Albert Kudjabo's sound recording was used in the art installation "...and to those North Sea waves whispering sunken stories" by Sammy Baloji.

Further reading

External links 
 Sound recording of Kudjabo at the installation of Sammy Baloji

References 

 1896 births
 1934 deaths
Belgian Army personnel of World War I
World War I prisoners of war held by Germany
Belgian prisoners of war
Belgian Congo people
Belgian Congo in World War I
Military history of the Democratic Republic of the Congo
Congolese military personnel of the Belgian Army during World War I